A list of animated feature films released in 2005

Highest-grossing animated films of the year

See also
 List of animated television series of 2005

References

 Feature films
2005
2005-related lists